JP Motorsports was an American professional stock car racing team that competed in the NASCAR Xfinity Series, and was owned by Jerry and Phyllis Hattaway. The team planned to compete in 2019, but never announced any drivers for the year. JPM was formed in early 2018 from the assets of TriStar Motorsports' Xfinity Series program. 

The Hattaways, before forming their own team, and previously has alliances with Derrike Cope Racing and MBM Motorsports.

Xfinity Series

Team history
The team first became involved in NASCAR when they became partners in Derrike Cope Racing at the beginning of 2016. The partnership dissolved by the end of the season with Cope closing his team. The team then partnered with MBM Motorsports for Iowa's summer race in 2017 with Bobby Dale Earnhardt as the driver, though he failed to qualify.

The team's maiden independent voyage was for a full season in 2018; although the team made it through the year it was not without its low spots. Team owner Jerry Hattaway was knocked out by ex-employee Mike Hayden in a Dover International Speedway garage in spring; Hayden had just quit his job, unhappy about unpaid wages and a chaotic work environment. He also later commented that Hattaway threatened some employees and got in fights with other employees and at times had pending legal consequences because of them, although Hattaway denied the report. Along with unpaid wages, unpaid bills to parts and engine companies added up throughout the season, leading the team's original parts supplier to stop doing business with the team, and disagreements about payment ensued after TriStar Motorsports rented JPM a hauler for 2018. One of the team's drivers, Brandon Hightower, eventually sued the team after his departure, although that case was later dropped. In October, Hattaway admitted that the team struggled, having little funding, 12 employees and very little in terms of planning. After the 2018 season, both of the team's drivers at the end of the year departed. Josh Bilicki went to RSS Racing and Bayley Currey went to Rick Ware Racing.

Car No. 45 history

On February 5, 2018, it was announced that Josh Bilicki would drive a second full time car, the No. 45, for JP with sponsorship coming from previous Bilicki partner Prevagen. The deal with Bilicki came after the team acquired an old Joe Gibbs Racing car to complement its original stable of TriStar Motorsports cars. The team failed to qualify for the PowerShares QQQ 300 and the Rinnai 250, but has run every race since, save for the season finale at Homestead-Miami Speedway. Bayley Currey replaced Bilicki in the No. 45 entry at Texas Motor Speedway, moving over from the 55.

Car No. 45 Results

Car No. 55 history

In 2018, JP Motorsports announced that Stephen Leicht would drive the No. 55 car for the full 2018 season, with Jason Houghtaling as his crew chief. Jennifer Jo Cobb replaced Leicht in the No. 55 at Talladega. After Leicht returned to run at Dover, the team and driver parted ways. Brandon Hightower stepped in as driver starting at Charlotte Motor Speedway. Hightower later left the team after Kentucky following a dispute about asset ownership; Bayley Currey stepped in as a last-minute replacement at Loudon. Sports car driver Dylan Murcott drove the car at Mid-Ohio but was relegated to last after a first-lap crash. Currey then became the team's oval driver, with Wisconsin native James French taking over the seat at Road America.

Car No. 55 results

References

External links

 

American auto racing teams
Defunct NASCAR teams
2018 establishments in California